T2B may refer to:

 t2B, code for a version of the Scion xB
 T2B, a temperature classification, also referred to as a T-code, on electrical equipment labeled for hazardous locations